Michael Zetterer (born 12 July 1995) is a German professional footballer who plays as a goalkeeper for Bundesliga club SV Werder Bremen.

Club career
Zetterer started playing football with local DJK Darching in Valley, Bavaria. At the age of eleven, in 2006, he moved to the youth ranks of SpVgg Unterhaching where he passed through all the youth and the senior's reserve team. In December 2012, he signed a professional contract for three years effective 2013 until 2016.

SpVgg Unterhaching
For the 2013–14 season, Zetterer first served as reserve goalkeeper behind Korbinian Müller. After Müller had shown weaknesses at set pieces, head coach Manuel Baum promoted Zetterer to the new regular goalkeeper. He made his debut on 1 March 2014, in a 4–2 loss away at Hallescher FC. Although Müller returned once between the sheets, Zetterer started in eleven of the last twelve matches of the season.

In the 2014–15 season, Zetterer remained Unterhaching's regular goalkeeper, the youngest of his kind in the 3. Liga. His performances drew the interest of the Germany national youth football team and several Bundesliga clubs.

Werder Bremen
In January 2015, Zetterer moved to Bundesliga side Werder Bremen. According to media reports, he signed a contract until 2018 and cost a transfer fee of €100,000. He took up the role of second reserve keeper behind Raphael Wolf and Koen Casteels. In the second half of the 2014–2015 season, Zetterer had seven appearances with Werder Bremen's reserve team contributing to its promotion from the fourth tier Regionalliga to the 3. Liga.

With Wolf injured Zetterer was second goalkeeper of the first team for most of the first half of the 2015–2016 season. He made his first appearance of the season in the reserve team's 3–2 defeat of Chemnitzer FC on 1 November 2015.

Zetterer was largely kept out of action by two scaphoid fractures he suffered in 2015 and 2016, and resulting complications made a further surgery necessary in November 2017. In July 2018, he agreed a contract extension until 2019 with Werder Bremen.

In February 2019, he joined Austria Klagenfurt on loan. 

In June, Zetterer agreed a "long-term" extension with Werder Bremen and a two-year loan move to Eredivisie side PEC Zwolle.

Zetterer's loan to PEC Zwolle was cut short and he again extended his contract in January 2021, after Werder Bremen agreed to loan out Stefanos Kapino.

On 11 September 2022, he made his Bundesliga debut, replacing the injured Jiří Pavlenka in a 1–0 defeat to FC Augsburg.

International career
In August 2014, Zetterer was nominated for the Germany U20 national 
team for the first time. Thus far he has earned four caps for them.

Career statistics

References

1995 births
Living people
German footballers
Footballers from Munich
Association football goalkeepers
Germany youth international footballers
Germany under-21 international footballers
SpVgg Unterhaching players
SV Werder Bremen players
SV Werder Bremen II players
PEC Zwolle players
SK Austria Klagenfurt players
Bundesliga players
2. Bundesliga players
3. Liga players
2. Liga (Austria) players
Eredivisie players
German expatriate footballers
German expatriate sportspeople in Austria
Expatriate footballers in Austria